James Arthur Mann (born 15 December 1952, Goole, Yorkshire) is an English retired footballer who made over 230 appearances in the Football League as a midfielder predominantly for Bristol City.

Career

Jimmy Mann began his career at Leeds United. He joined Bristol City in 1974 and gained renown as a skillful attacking midfielder who played a role in the Robins' promotion to the First Division under Alan Dicks in 1976. He remained at the club until the 1981–82 season, when he left the club as one of the "Ashton Gate Eight".

He is noted for scoring a spectacular long-range goal against Nottingham Forest during the Robins' stay in the First Division.

Brief spells at Barnsley, Scunthorpe United and Doncaster Rovers followed before moving into non-league football with Goole Town and Bentley Victoria.

After retiring from football Jimmy Mann returned to hometown Goole as a mobile security officer for Securicor, then as a Co-op milkman and from 1994 a marine operator at Goole Docks.

References

External links
 
 Profile (Citystats)
 Profile (leeds-fans.org.uk)

1952 births
Living people
English footballers
English Football League players
Leeds United F.C. players
Bristol City F.C. players
Barnsley F.C. players
Scunthorpe United F.C. players
Doncaster Rovers F.C. players
Goole Town F.C. players
People from Goole
Footballers from the East Riding of Yorkshire
Association football midfielders